Goshen was a pioneer town in western Whatcom County (approximately 5 miles northeast of Bellingham, and 10 miles south of the US border with Canada).  

Goshen was a logging and farming community.

It was a stop on the rail line of the Bellingham Bay and British Columbia Railroad. 
At one point Goshen hoped to compete with Whatcom (now Bellingham) and Seattle for the western depot of the railroad line which was being laid north to Washington State, which would guarantee economic investment and much traffic.  Tacoma won the contest. 

The name remains in Goshen Road and, a short distance to the west, Everson-Goshen Road.

References

Ghost towns in Washington (state)
Geography of Whatcom County, Washington